Moratalla is a small town and the center of a large municipality of the same name in the Autonomous Community of the Region of Murcia in southeastern Spain.  In 2018, the population of Moratalla was 7,944: some 5,600 in the town of Moratalla itself and the rest in districts such as Otos, Benizar, El Sabinar or Casa Requena.

Its main economic resources are tourism and agriculture (apricots, almonds, olives and olive oil, wood, barley).

Geography
It is chiefly a mountainous and comparatively cool territory (with regard to the region), snow being frequent in the highest zones (Revolcadores) and cold valleys (Campo de San Juan, El Sabinar). It is crossed by minor rivers (Alhárabe, Benamor) which flow into the Segura. There is a main reservoir of the Segura at El Cenajo. Main representatives of the local fauna are wild boars, Spanish Ibex, short-toed eagles and Moorish turtles. Wide portions of the municipality are protected in ZEPAs (Special Protection Areas) or LICs (Site of Community Importance areas).

History 
There are some spots with cave paintings in this current municipality that give of people occupancy during the Prehistory.

There was presence of people during the Bronze Age, and presence of people who belonged to Argaric culture during the late Bronze Age.

After the Muslim invasion (711-726), some Berber clans settled in Moratalla.

Moratalla was conquered by the Order of Santiago (a religious military order) in 1212, in the context of Reconquista and the Battle of Las Navas de Tolosa.

An own municipality was established for Moratalla in 1245, after the Castilian conquest in Taifa of Murcia, and it split from the municipality Segura de la Sierra (in Jaén province).

Francis, Duke of Cádiz (13 May 1822 – 17 April 1902), king consort of Spain, adopted the incognito title of Count of Moratalla after his exile to France in 1868.

Demographics 
4.25% inhabitants are foreigners – 1.5% are from other countries of Europe, 2.15% are Africans, 36 (0.45%) are Americans and 12 Asian people (0.15%) reside in Moratalla. The table below shows the population trend during 20th and 21st centuries by the beginning of the decades.

Economy 
22.3% of the territory is utilised for agriculture purposes and the most widely grown products are the almonds, the barley, the olives, the oats and the lavender. 12.17% agreements were signed for agriculture and fishing jobs, 46.91% were written for jobs in the industry sector, and 35.87% were signed by workers of the service sector.

Main sights
Moratalla's sights include  the Fortress Castle, home to the "Tribute Tower", a military-gothic style building which dates from the 15th century. There is also an Arab castle in Benizar, built in the 12th century.

The Catholic Church of Our Lady of the Asunción dates from the  16th century). Other churches include Santa Ana or San Francisco and the "House of Christ", on the mountain, built by the Order of La Merced from the 16th century.

There are two Roman bridges in Moratalla: the Jesus Christ Bridge over the Benámor River, and the Hellin Bridge over the Alhárabe River.

Events

Holy Week 

During the Holy Week, there is a traditional tamborada, a collective drumming, which can last all day long. In southern Spain, tamboradas are characteristic of Moratalla as well as of Mula (in Murcia) and Hellín and Tobarra (in Albacete).  A unique aspect of Moratalla's Holy Week is that every tamborista (drummer) dresses in distinct, handmade robes. Drums are also traditionally handmade.

Fiestas del Santísimo Cristo del Rayo (Holy Thör of the Thunder Celebrations) July 11–17 
This celebration takes place in the streets of Moratalla, in which cows and bulls are set free. People get together into their peñas, placed in the Eldest Street "Calle Mayor", where they enjoy the party. There is also a fair which may be visited every night from 10 to 17 July. It's like an amusement park with many "street-shops" where you can buy some handmade products.

Notable people 
Esteban Navarro (Moratalla, 1965), writer. Born in Moratalla.

Images

See also
Inazares
 Cañada de la Cruz

References 

 Population in 2009 (where 000000=municipality; 000200=city)

External links 
 Official website 
 Asociación de tamboristas 
 Information and tourism resources 
 Viva Murcia community info for Moratalla

Municipalities in the Region of Murcia